The Digger was an alternative magazine published in Australia between August 1972 and December 1975. It was established by Phillip Frazer, Bruce Hanford, and Jon Hawkes. Notable contributors included Ron Cobb, Ian McCausland, Bob Daly, Patrick Cook, Beatrice Faust, Ponch Hawkes, Helen Garner, Michael Leunig, Anne Summers, Neil McLean, and Phil Pinder. The headquarters was in Carlton, Victoria.

Background
With Frazer as the common thread, The Digger was produced by a frequently changing collective—including Bruce Hanford, Helen Garner, Ponch Hawkes, Jenny (Jewel) Brown, Colin Talbot, Garrie Hutchinson, Virginia Fraser, Hall Greenland, Grant Evans, and Michael Zerman in the Sydney office—until December 1975, when it folded under the weight of too little money and too many lawsuits: a libel suit from Builders Labourers union boss Norm Gallagher, another filed by the head of the South Australian Police, and an obscenity case brought by the State of Victoria for Helen Garner's article describing a sex-education class. Frazer left Australia for the United States in July 1976, and has been a publisher, editor, and writer in both countries ever since. Frazer's blog coorabellridge.com includes numerous posts of articles and graphics from The Digger archive.

Helen Garner wrote an October 1972 essay article for The Digger under a pen name, in which she chronicled a spontaneous sex education lesson she gave to her 13-year-old students while working as a teacher at Fitzroy High School. In the article, Garner revealed that she had intended to give a lesson on Ancient Greece, but the textbooks given to her students had been defaced with sexually explicit imagery. As a result of those images, the class posed questions relating to sex to Garner, who decided to allow an uninhibited discussion based on their questions, which she vowed to answer accurately.

When her identity was revealed, she was called into the Victorian Department of Education and fired on the spot. The case was widely publicised in Melbourne, bringing Garner a degree of notoriety. Her colleagues, along with members of the Victorian Secondary Teachers Association, went on strike in protest at the deputy director of Secondary Education's decision to fire Garner. As a result of her dismissal as a teacher, she began writing, and published the cult classic novel Monkey Grip six years later, which established her writing career.

References

External links
 The Digger on Milesago

1972 establishments in Australia
1975 disestablishments in Australia
Alternative magazines
Defunct political magazines published in Australia
English-language magazines
Magazines established in 1972
Magazines disestablished in 1975
Magazines published in Melbourne